This article lists compositions written for the viola.  The list includes works in which the viola is a featured instrument: viola solo, viola and piano, viola and orchestra, ensemble of violas, etc.  Catalogue number, date of composition and publisher (for copyrighted works) are also included.  Ordering is by composer surname.

This pages lists composers whose surname falls into the L to N alphabetic range.  For others, see respective pages:
 List of compositions for viola: A to B
 List of compositions for viola: C to E
 List of compositions for viola: F to H
 List of compositions for viola: I to K
 List of compositions for viola: O to R
 List of compositions for viola: S
 List of compositions for viola: T to Z

L
 Marcel Labey (1875–1968)
     Sonata in C major for viola and piano, Op. 7 (1904); Éditions Max Eschig
 Joseph Labitzky (1802–1881)
     L'adieu: Romance sans paroles in B major for viola and piano, Op. 286 (1872)
 Osvaldo Lacerda (1927–2011)
     Appassionato, cantilena e toccata for viola and piano (1977); Universidade de São Paulo; Academia Brasileira de Música
     Choro seresteiro e fuga for clarinet and viola (1998); Academia Brasileira de Música
     Fuga e postlúdio for violin and viola (1999); Academia Brasileira de Música
     Sonata for viola and piano (1962)
 Piotr Lachert (1938–2018)
     Katanick for viola and harpsichord (1986); CeBeDeM
     Sonata No. 4 for viola and piano (1991); CeBeDeM
 Ignaz Lachner (1807–1895)
     Trio No. 1 in B major for violin, viola and piano, Op. 37 (1851)
     Trio No. 2 in G major for violin, viola and piano, Op. 45 (1856)
     Trio No. 3 in D major for violin, viola and piano, Op. 58 (1868)
     Trio No. 4 in D minor for violin, viola and piano, Op. 89 (1879)
     Trio No. 5 in E major for violin, viola and piano, Op. 102 (1893)
     Trio No. 6 in C major for violin, viola and piano, Op. 103 (1893)
 Paul Lacombe (1837–1927)
     Morceau de fantaisie (Fantasy Piece) in D major for viola and piano, Op. 133 (1909)
 Ezra Laderman (1924–2015)
     Concerto for viola and chamber orchestra (1977); G. Schirmer
     Concerto for viola and orchestra (2001, 2007); G. Schirmer
     Elegy for viola solo (1973); G. Schirmer
     Fantasy for viola solo (1985); G. Schirmer
 Yehoshua Lakner (1924–2003)
     Improvisation for viola solo (1952); Israeli Music Publications
     Einwürfe for viola solo (1984)
 Marvin Lamb (b. 1946)
     Fantasy for viola and piano (2011)
     Grappelli Dreams for alto saxophone and viola (2008); Carl Fischer
     House of Dawn for 4 violas (or viola ensemble) (2008)
 Ricard Lamote de Grignon (1899–1962)
     Scherzino for viola and piano (1943); Clivis Publicacions
 John La Montaine (1920–2013)
     Conversations for viola and piano, Op. 42 (1977); Fredonia Press
 Serge Lancen (1922–2005)
     Lied (Song) for viola and piano (1970); Lido Mélodies; Éditions Alphonse Leduc; United Music Publishers
     Si j'étais – (If I Were –) for cello or viola or bassoon and piano (1981); Lido Mélodies; United Music Publishers
 Jeanne Landry (1922–2011)
     Trois poèmes (3 Poems) for viola and piano (1999); Doberman-Yppan
 Samuel de Lange (1840–1911)
     Adagio for viola and organ, Op. 59 (1892); J. Rieter-Biedermann; Amadeus Verlag
     Concerto for viola and orchestra (1900)
     Geistliches Lied (Sacred Song) for soprano, viola and organ (1899)
     Sonata No. 1 in A minor for viola and piano (1886, 1893)
     Sonata No. 2 in A major for viola and piano (1911)
 Vanessa Lann (b. 1968)
     In the Circumference of My Solitude for viola and double bass (scordatura) (1993); Donemus
 Pierre Lantier (1910–1998)
     Diptyque for viola and piano (1971); Chappell Music; United Music Publishers
     Sonata for viola and piano (1991); Editions Combre; United Music Publishers
 Raoul Laparra (1876–1943)
     Suite ancienne en marge de Don Quichotte for violin or viola and piano (1921); Heugel
 Thomas Larcher (b. 1963)
     Still for viola and chamber orchestra (2002, revised 2004); Schott Music
 Libby Larsen (b. 1950)
     Bid Call for alto saxophone (or viola) and cello (2003); Oxford University Press
     Black Birds, Red Hills, a Portrait of Six Paintings of Georgia O'Keeffe for clarinet, viola and piano (2005); Oxford University Press
     Black Roller for solo viola, flute, oboe, clarinet, bassoon, violin, cello and piano (1981); ECS Publishing
     In Such a Night for 2 violas and recorded voice (2010); text from The Merchant of Venice by William Shakespeare
     Sifting through the Ruins for mezzo-soprano, viola and piano (2005)
     Sonata for viola and piano (2001); Oxford University Press
     Trio in Four Movements for flute, viola and harp (2005)
 Lars-Erik Larsson (1908–1986)
     Concertino for viola and string orchestra, Op. 45 No. 9 (1956); Carl Gehrmans Musikförlag; Boosey & Hawkes
 Eduard Lassen (1830–1904)
     Die Waldbrüder for voice, viola obbligato and piano, No. 4 from Fünf Lieder, Op. 46 (1874); words by Theodor Storm; Julius Hainauer; G. Schirmer
 Philip Lasser (b. 1963)
     Sonata for viola solo (1986); Éditions Max Eschig
     Vocalise for violin (or viola, or cello) and string quartet (2003)
 Faustas Latėnas (1956–2020)
     Lipsi for viola and piano (1988)
     Pasodoblis (Pasodoble) for viola and piano or string orchestra (1988); Lithuanian Music Information and Publishing Centre
     Rondo Sonata for viola and piano (2018); Lithuanian Music Information and Publishing Centre
 Ferdinand Laub (1832–1875)
     Trois Morceaux (3 Pieces) for viola and piano, Op. 14 (published 1883)
 Anne Lauber (b. 1943)
     Concerto for string quartet and orchestra (1983); Canadian Music Centre
     Mouvement for viola and piano (1980); Canadian Music Centre
     Quatre pensées (Four Thoughts) for viola solo (1990); Canadian Music Centre
 Anna-Lena Laurin (b. 1962)
     Danse joyeux de la ville blanche for viola and piano (2012)
 Elodie Lauten (1950–2014)
     Prophecy for viola solo (1999)
 Mario Lavista (1943–2021)
     Cuaderno de Viaje for viola solo (1989); Ediciones Mexicanas de Musica; Peer Music Classical
 Marc Lavry (1903–1967)
     Concerto for viola and orchestra, Op. 247 (1953); The Marc Lavry Heritage Society
     Suite concertante for flute, viola and harp, Op. 348 (1966)
 Henri Lazarof (1932–2013)
     Anida, Duo Concertante for violin and viola (1998); Theodore Presser Company
     Cadence II for viola and tape (1969); Bote and Bock
     Concerto for viola and orchestra; Theodore Presser Company
     Five Poems for viola solo (2004); Merion Music; Theodore Presser Company
     Harp Trio "The Litomar" for flute, viola and harp (2004); Merion Music; Theodore Presser Company
     Inventions for viola and piano (1962); Theodore Presser Company
     Six Bagatelles for solo viola (1996); Theodore Presser Company
     Rhapsody for viola and orchestra (1997); Theodore Presser Company
      Ricercar for viola, piano and orchestra (1968); Associated Music Publishers
     Volo (Tre Canti da Requiem) for viola and 2 string ensembles (1975); Theodore Presser Company
 Ramón Lazkano (b. 1968)
     Chant II for viola and tape, or viola solo and 4 violas (1989); Éditions Le Chant du Monde
     Hizpide for alto flute, viola and guitar (1995); Éditions Le Chant du Monde
 Victor Lazzarini (b. 1969)
     Duas Danças (2 Dances) for viola and piano (1987–1988); Contemporary Music Centre Ireland
 Luise Adolpha Le Beau (1850–1927)
     Drei Stücke (3 Pieces) for viola and piano, Op. 26 (1881)
 Lojze Lebič (b. 1934)
     Meditacije za dva (Meditations for Two) for viola and cello (1965, revised 1972); Edicije Društva Slovenskih Skladateljev
     Rubato per viola for viola solo (1989); Edicije Društva Slovenskih Skladateljev
 Fernand Le Borne (1862–1929)
     Rêverie for viola and piano (or orchestra), Op. 55 (1910)
 Jean-Marie Leclair (1697–1764)
     6 Sonatas for 2 violas, Op. 12 (1749); Edition Schott
 Brent Lee (b. 1964)
     I Wait for You in the Gathering Light for viola solo (2001); Canadian Music Centre
     More Fog for viola and percussion (1993); Canadian Music Centre
 Sebastian Lee (1805–1887)
     Sept pièces mélodiques d'une difficulté modérée d'après les études mélodiques for cello or violin or viola and piano (1884)
     Sous le balcon: Sérénade sur le Barbier de Séville de Rossini for cello or viola and piano, Op. 75 (1856)
 Stephen Leek (b. 1959)
     Goombungee for viola (or violin, or cello) and piano (1989); Australian Music Centre
 Nicola LeFanu (b. 1947)
     Songs for Jane for soprano and viola (2005); Maecenas Music; Edition Peters
 Charles-Édouard Lefebvre (1843–1917)
     Cantabile for viola d'amore or viola and piano, Op. 82 (1892)
     Caprice in A minor for viola and orchestra or piano, Op. 106b (1898, 1900)
 Victor Legley (1915–1994)
     Ballade No. 2 for viola and piano, Op. 86 No. 2 (1975); CeBeDeM
     Caractères (Characters) for viola and guitar, Op. 106 (1985); CeBeDeM
     Elegisch Lied (English Song) for viola and piano, Op. 7 (1944); CeBeDeM
     Poème du printemps (Poem of Spring) for viola and piano, Op. 51 No. 2 (1958); CeBeDeM
     Sonata for viola and piano, Op. 13 (1943); CeBeDeM
     Vier Miniaturen (4 Miniatures) for viola solo, Op. 118 No. 1 (1991); CeBeDeM
     Concerto for viola and orchestra, Op. 78 (1971); CeBeDeM
 Hans Ulrich Lehmann (1937–2013)
     Contradictions, Concertino for viola and chamber orchestra (2008); Edition Gamma
     Duo for viola and double bass (2009); Edition Gamma
     Magica for mezzo-soprano, flute and viola (2006); words by Donata Berra
     Structures transparentes for clarinet, viola and piano (1960)
     Studien (Studies) for viola solo (1966); Ars Viva Verlag; Edition Schott
     viola in all moods and senses for viola solo (2003); Edition Gravis
     Without Words (Ohne Worte), 7 Songs for viola and piano (2010–2011); Edition Gamma
 René Leibowitz (1913–1972)
     Concertino for viola and chamber orchestra, Op. 35 (1954); Mobart Music
     Sonatina for flute, viola and harp, Op. 69 (1966); Mobart Music
 Hugo Leichtentritt (1874–1951)
     Sonata for viola and piano, Op. 13 (c.1910)
 Walter Leigh (1905–1942)
     Sonatina for viola and piano (1930); Comus Edition
 Kenneth Leighton (1929–1988)
     Concerto for viola and harp with string orchestra and timpani, Op. 15 (1952); Novello & Co.
     Fantasia on the Name BACH for viola and piano, Op. 29 (1955); Novello & Co.
 Ernst Ludwig Leitner (b. 1943)
     Chansons for viola and string orchestra (1993); Verlag Doblinger
 Édith Lejet (b. 1941)
     Almost a Song for viola and guitar (1995); Éditions Max Eschig
 Vlastimil Lejsek (1927–2010)
     Dvě skladby (2 Pieces) for viola and piano (1959)
 Aubert Lemeland (1932–2010)
     Duo Variations for viola and guitar, Op. 77 (1982); Éditions Gérard Billaudot
     Sonata for viola solo, Op. 7 (1966); Éditions Jean Jobert
 Kamilló Lendvay (1928–2016)
     24 Duos for 2 violins or violin and viola (1985); Ayqu Music, Budapest; Editio Musica Budapest
     Tanulmány (Study) for viola solo (1995); Ayqu Music, Budapest; Editio Musica Budapest
 Jacques Lenot (b. 1945)
     De la mélancolie for viola solo (1987); Éditions Salabert
     Échappée for viola and piano (1982); Éditions Salabert
     Esquif for viola and piano (2002); L'Oiseau Prophète
     Frammento per l'armonia della notte for viola and harp (1975); Éditions Salabert
     Il meraviglioso, anzi (Titre de Alberto Arbasino) for viola solo (2005); L'Oiseau Prophète
     Parmi les hiérarchies des anges for viola and organ soli and orchestra (1985); Éditions Salabert
     Trois pièces for viola and piano (1995)
     Utopia glossa seconda for viola solo (1982); Éditions Salabert
 James Lentini (b. 1958)
     Big City Stomp for viola, baritone sax, and bayan (2006)
     El Signo del Angel for viola and harp (2004)
     Scenes from Sedona for viola and cello (1996); European American Music
 Georges Lentz (b. 1965)
     Monh from Mysterium (Caeli enarrant... VII) for solo viola, orchestra and electronics (2001–2005); Universal Edition
 Tania León (b. 1943)
     Hebras d' Luz (Threads of Light) for electric viola (2004)
     Para Viola y Orquesta for viola and orchestra (1994); Southern Music Publishing; Peer Music Classical
 Fred Lerdahl (b. 1943)
     Imitations (6 Études) for flute, viola and harp (1979); Mobart Music
 Terje Bjørn Lerstad (b. 1955)
     6 Etyder for Bratsj-band (6 Etudes for Viola Band) for 6 violas, Op. 201b (1994); Music Information Centre Norway
     Fantasi (Fantasy) for viola solo, Op. 15 (1983); Music Information Centre Norway
 Jonathan Leshnoff (b. 1973)
     Double Concerto for violin, viola and orchestra (2007); Leshnoff Publishing
     Three Minute Chaconne for viola solo (2011); also for violin or cello solo; Leshnoff Publishing
 John Lessard (1920–2003)
     Concert duo for viola and guitar (1981); American Composers Alliance
     Four Pieces for viola and percussion (1985?); American Composers Alliance
     Movements for Trumpet and Various Instruments II for trumpet and viola (1978); American Composers Alliance
 Harold Levin (b. 1956)
     Five Pieces for clarinet, viola and trumpet (2001); Jomar Press
     Rhapsodie for viola and piano (1975)
     Two Haiku Songs for soprano, viola and piano (1998); Jomar Press
 Zara Levina (1906–1976)
     Poema (Поема) for viola and piano (1928); Muzsektor gosizdata; Universal Edition
 Michaël Lévinas (b. 1949)
     Arcades for viola and piano (1982); Éditions Salabert; Éditions Henry Lemoine
     Arcades II for viola and 12 instruments (1982); Éditions Henry Lemoine
     Les Lettres enlacées II: Fragments d'une lettre for viola solo (2000); Éditions Henry Lemoine
     Les Lettres enlacées V for 2 violas (2006); Éditions Henry Lemoine
 Yuri Levitin (1912–1993)
     Variations for violin (or viola) solo, Op. 45 (c.1956); Sovetsky Kompozitor
 Ernst Levy (1895–1981)
     Sonata for viola and piano (1979)
     Suite for 2 violas (1963)
     Suite [No. 1] for viola or cello solo (1956)
     Suite No. 2 for viola solo (1971)
     Trio for clarinet, viola and piano (1968); Seesaw Music
     Threnodie for viola, cello and organ (1975)
 Frank Lewin (1925–2008)
     Concerto Armonico for viola and orchestra (1960); revision of Concerto for Harmonica and Orchestra by Brett Deubner (2006); Notevole Music Publishing
     Concerto on Silesian Tunes for viola and orchestra (1965); Notevole Music Publishing; American Composers Alliance
 Ulrich Leyendecker (1946–2018)
     Concerto for viola and orchestra (2007–2008); Hans Sikorski
     Etüde for viola solo (1989)
     Sonata for flute, viola and harp (1988); Hans Sikorski
     Trio for viola, bass clarinet and piano (1966, revised 2001); Hans Sikorski
 Fran Lhotka (1883–1962)
     Sljepačka for viola and piano (1960); Muzička Naklada, Zagreb
 Lei Liang (b. 1972)
     Feng for viola solo (1998); original for cello solo; Schott Music
     Gobi Canticle for violin and viola (2005); original for violin and cello; Schott Music; Project Schott New York
     Lakescape III for 2 violas, or viola solo (2014); Schott Music
 Andreas Lidel (c.1740–c.1789)
     6 Duos for violin and viola, Op. 3 (c.1780); Amadeus Verlag; Bärenreiter Verlag
 Ingvar Lidholm (1921–2017)
     Invention for viola and cello (1954); STIM; Swedish Music Information Centre
 José Lidón (1748–1827)
     Sonata in D minor for viola and basso continuo (1806); Editorial de Música Boileau
 Lowell Liebermann (b. 1961)
     Sonata for viola and piano, Op. 13 (1984); Theodore Presser Company
     Two Pieces for violin and viola, Op. 4 (1978); Theodore Presser Company
 Peter Lieberson (1946–2011)
     Concerto for viola and orchestra (1992); G. Schirmer
     Rhapsody for viola and orchestra (1994); G. Schirmer
     Rumble for viola, double bass and percussion (1994); G. Schirmer
 Max Lifchitz (b. 1948)
     Yellow Ribbons No. 22 (Lamento) for viola and piano (1982)
 György Ligeti (1923–2006)
     Sonata for viola solo (1991–1994); Edition Schott
 Douglas Lilburn (1915–2001)
     Canzonetta No. 1 for violin and viola (1942); Centre for New Zealand Music
     Canzonetta No. 2 for violin and viola (1943); Centre for New Zealand Music
     Canzonetta No. 3 for violin and viola (1958); Centre for New Zealand Music
     Piece for Solo Viola for viola solo; Centre for New Zealand Music
     Suite for viola solo (1954, revised 1955); SOUNZ, Centre for New Zealand Music
     Three Songs for baritone and viola (1958); SOUNZ, Centre for New Zealand Music
 Liza Lim (b. 1966)
     Amulet for viola solo (1992); G. Ricordi London; Australian Music Centre
 Norbert Linke (1933–2020)
     Elegie und Tanz (Elegy and Dance) for viola solo (1992); Verlag Neue Musik
 Malcolm Lipkin (1932–2017)
     Pierrot Dances for viola and piano (1998)
     Trio for flute, viola and harp (1982)
 Marijan Lipovšek (1910–1995)
     Dva dua (Two Duos) for violin and viola (1959); Društvo Slovenskih Skladateljev
 David Liptak (b. 1949)
     Concerto for viola and percussion (2005); Lauren Keiser Music Publishing
     Duo for viola and piano (1996); MMB Music; Lauren Keiser Music Publishing
     Melissa's Quilt for viola and marimba (1999); MMB Music; Lauren Keiser Music Publishing
     The Play of Winds for viola solo (2000); MMB Music; Lauren Keiser Music Publishing
     Pulse Music for mezzo-soprano, flute and viola (1984); American Composers Alliance
     Serenade for alto saxophone or viola and string orchestra (2001)
     Trio for viola, percussion and piano (2007); Lauren Keiser Music Publishing
 Franz Liszt (1811–1886)
     Liebestraum, Notturno No. 3 in A major for viola and piano, S. 541 (c.1850); original for piano; transcription by Lionel Tertis; Comus Edition
     Romance oubliée for viola and piano, S. 132 (1880)
 Lino Liviabella (1902–1964)
     Quattro brani nuziali (4 Wedding Songs) for viola and organ or harmonium (1961)
     S. Francesco, Meditazione for viola, 2 violins, double bass and organ (1926)
     Sette duetti miniatura (7 Miniature Duets) for violin and viola (1957)
     Sonata No. 1 "in One Movement" (Prima Sonata in un tempo) for viola and piano (1950); original manuscript
     Sonata No. 2 for viola and piano (1957)
     Tre momenti (3 Moments) for viola and piano (1956)
     Tre preghiere per la sera (Three Evening Prayers) for voice, viola and piano (1958); words by Lucio Liviabella
 Charles Harford Lloyd (1849–1919)
     Duo Concertante for violin (or viola, or clarinet) and piano (1888); Novello
     Suite in the Old Style for clarinet (or viola) and piano (1914); Boosey & Hawkes
 Jonathan Lloyd (b. 1948)
     Between Us a River, before Us the Sea for violin or viola and CD (2002)
     Concerto for viola and small orchestra (1979–1980); Boosey & Hawkes
     Like Fallen Angels for flute, viola and harp (1986); Boosey & Hawkes
 William Lloyd Webber (1914–1982)
     Sonatina for viola and piano (1951); Stainer & Bell
 Vasily Lobanov (b. 1947)
     Concerto No. 1 for viola and string orchestra, Op. 53 (1989); Hans Sikorski
     Concerto No. 2 for viola and string orchestra, Op. 71 (1998)
     Kleine Suite im alten Stil (Little Suite in Old Style) for viola solo, Op. 63 (1992)
     Sonata for viola and piano, Op. 58 (1990); Hans Sikorski
     4 Stücke im strengen Stil (4 Pieces in a Strict Style) for clarinet or viola and piano, Op. 43 (1984); Hans Sikorski
 Dan Locklair (b. 1949)
     Dream Steps, Dance Suite for flute, viola and harp (1993); Subito Music
 David Loeb (b. 1939)
     Brugsegezichten (Faces of Bruges) for flute and viola
     Duo Concertante for viola and cello (1984); Accentuate Music
     Elegy for viola and double bass (1977); Accentuate Music
     Entr'actes for 2 violins and viola
     Fantasia for 2 violas (1984)
     Fantasia Concertante for viola and string orchestra (1985)
     Fantasia on a Tibetan Minstrel Song "Tasar Lung Gi Shokpa" for viola solo (1980); Harold Branch Publishing; Accentuate Music
     Four Songs from "Leaves of Grass" for baritone and viola (1984); words by Walt Whitman; Accentuate Music
     3 Litanies for violin and viola
     Lyric Pieces for viola solo; Accentuate Music
     Madrigaletti for oboe and viola
     Nocturnes and Arias for violin and viola
     Of Mountains and Rivers without End for solo viola
     Preludes for Several Millennia for viola solo
     Rhapsodic Miniatures for viola solo
     Snowscapes for viola and percussion (1996)
     Sonata for flute, viola and harp (1988)
     Sonata No. 1 for viola solo
     Sonata No. 2 for viola solo
     Sonata No. 3 for viola solo (1963)
     Sonata No. 4 for viola solo (published 1984); Accentuate Music
     Sonata No. 5 for viola solo
     Sonata No. 6 for viola solo
     Sonata No. 1 for viola and cello
     Sonata No. 2 for viola and cello (1979)
     Sonata No. 1 for viola and piano; Harold Branch Publishing
     Sonata No. 2 for viola and piano (1975)
     Sonata No. 1 for violin and viola (1960)
     Sonata No. 2 for violin and viola
     Sonata No. 3 for violin and viola (1979); Harold Branch Publishing
     Sonata No. 4 for violin and viola
     Sonata No. 5 for violin and viola (1981)
     Sonata No. 6 for violin and viola
     Suite for clarinet and viola
     Suite [No. 1] for viola solo (1980); Accentuate Music
     Suite No. 2 for viola solo (1980)
     Suite No. 3 for viola solo (1987)
     Three Fantasias for 2 violas (1975)
     Three Fantasias for violin and viola (1985)
     Trois cansos for flute, viola and guitar (1984)
     Two Intermezzi for viola solo; Harold Branch Publishing
 Charles Martin Loeffler (1861–1935)
     Quatre Poèmes for medium voice, viola and piano, Op. 5; McGinnis & Marx
     Deux Rhapsodies for oboe, viola and piano
 Theo Loevendie (b. 1930)
     Sonata Coloniae for viola solo (1999); PeerMusic Classical
 Fred Lohse (1908–1987)
     Sonata for viola and piano (1953); Editions Metropolis
 Luca Lombardi (b. 1945)
     Bab for viola solo (2003); Rai Trade
     Concerto for viola and orchestra (1995); Ricordi Milano
     Geburtstagsgruß für Thomas und Bernhard for violin and viola (2003)
     Rnnili for viola solo (1995); Ricordi Milano
 Ruth Lomon (1930–2017)
     5 Songs after Poems by William Blake for alto and viola (1962); Arsis Press
 Alessandro Longo (1864–1945)
     Suite for viola and piano, Op. 53 (1911); G. Ricordi; Prairie Dawg Press
 Paolo Longo (b. 1967)
     Ammonizione for mezzo-soprano, viola, vibraphone
     E già sono deserto – "Quasi un notturno" for viola and 5 instruments (2005)
 Georges Lonque (1900–1967)
     Images d'orient for viola and piano, Op. 20 (1930); Éditions Alphonse Leduc; CeBeDeM
 Fernando Lopes-Graça (1906–1994)
     Concertino for viola and orchestra, LG 72
     Quatro peças em suite (Suite of Four Pieces) for viola and piano, LG 102 (1978)
 Carlos López Buchardo (1881–1948)
     Dos piezas (2 Pieces) for viola and piano (1928); G. Ricordi
 Bernardo Lorenziti (1764–1813)
     3 Sonatas for viola and basso (cello), Op. 39 (1800)
 Ivana Loudová (1941–2017)
     Notturno for viola and string orchestra (1975); Český Hudební Fond
 Alexina Louie (b. 1949)
     Winter Music, Chamber Concerto for viola and 11 instruments (1989); Canadian Music Centre
 Alain Louvier (b. 1945)
     Concerto for viola and orchestra (1996); Editions Combre
     Envols d'écailles for flute, viola and harp (1987); Éditions Alphonse Leduc
     Sempre più alto for viola and piano (1981); Éditions Alphonse Leduc; United Music Publishers
 William Lovelock (1899–1986)
     Concerto for viola and orchestra (1960)
 David Ludwig (b. 1974)
     Flowers in the Desert for clarinet, viola and piano (2009)
 Raymond Luedeke (b. 1944)
     Brief Encounters for viola and piano (1996); American Composers Alliance; Canadian Music Centre
     My Secret Life for viola solo (1983); American Composers Alliance; Canadian Music Centre
     Silence! for suitcase percussion and viola (1986); Canadian Music Centre
     Sonata for viola and piano (1975); American Composers Alliance; Canadian Music Centre
 Otto Luening (1900–1996)
     Duo for flute and viola (1985); American Composers Alliance
     Duo for violin and viola, W194 (1976); Joshua Corporation; G. Schirmer
     Eight Tone Poems for 2 violas, W223 (1972); Joshua Corporation; G. Schirmer
     Fantasia for viola solo (1994); American Composers Alliance
     Sonata for viola solo (1958); Highgate Press
     Suite for viola and piano, W136 (1972); Highgate Press
 Enid Luff (1935–2022)
     Viola Lullaby for viola solo (1996); Primavera; Welsh Music Information Centre
 Pál Lukács (1919–1981)
     Fekvésváltó gyakorlatok mélyhegedűre, felső fokon (Exercises in Change of Position for Viola, Advanced Grade) (1959); Editio Musica Budapest; Zeneműkiado vállalat
 Zdeněk Lukáš (1928–2007)
     Cantabile for viola and harpsichord, Op. 216 (1988)
     Canto appassionato for viola and piano, Op. 308 (1999)
     Concerto for viola and orchestra, Op. 185 (1983); Český Hudební Fond
     Concerto for violin, viola and orchestra, Op. 58 (1968); Panton Praha; Český Hudební Fond
     Divertimento for violin and viola, Op. 96 (1973); Arco Diva; Český Hudební Fond
     Dolore ed amore for 4 violas, Op. 347
     Hosprenglic, Duo for viola and harp, Op. 328 (2002); Český Hudební Fond
     Hudba k vernisáži for viola and piano, Op. 68 (1970); Český Hudební Fond
     Lode al canto for men's chorus, viola solo and orchestra, Op. 94 (1973); Český Hudební Fond
     Meditace (Meditation) for viola and harpsichord, Op. 116 (1975); Český Hudební Fond
     Meditace – Rondo (Meditation – Rondo) for viola and harpsichord, Op. 128 (1977); Český Hudební Fond
     Rotlevův šlojíř, Trio for violin, viola and piano, Op. 354 (2007)
     Sonata for viola solo, Op. 243 (1991); Arco Diva; Artesmon; Český Hudební Fond
     Supplemento for viola and harpsichord, Op. 334
 John Lunn (b. 1956)
     Music for viola and piano; Scottish Music Centre
 Roberto Lupi (1908–1971)
     Varianti for viola and piano
 Witold Lutosławski (1913–1994)
     Bukoliki (Bucolics) for viola and cello (1952, arranged 1962); Polskie Wydawnictwo Muzyczne
 Elisabeth Lutyens (1906–1983)
     Echo of the Wind for viola solo, Op. 157 (1981); University of York Music Press
     Kareniana for viola and chamber ensemble, Op. 99 (1974); University of York Music Press
     The Singing Birds for speaker and viola, Op. 151 (1980); University of York Music Press
     Sonata for viola solo, Op. 5 No. 4 (1938); Alfred Lengnick
     Concerto for viola and orchestra, Op. 15 (1947); Alfred Lengnick
 Anatoly Lyadov (1855–1914)
     Prelude, Op. 11 No. 1; original from 3 Morceaux, Op. 11 (1886) for piano; 1950 transcription by Vadim Borisovsky
     Prelude in F major, Op. 57 No. 1; original for piano; transcription by Yevgeny Strakhov; Declaration of Love: Album of Popular Pieces for Viola and Piano (Страстное Признание: Альбом Популярных Пьес), Muzyka
 Sergei Lyapunov (1859–1924)
     Gifts of the Terek (Дары Терека), Cantata for viola solo, chorus and orchestra (1883)
 Borys Lyatoshynsky (1895–1968)
     2 Pieces: Nocturne and Scherzino (Дві п'єси: Нюктюрн і Скерцино) for viola and piano, Op. 65 (1963); Mistetstvo, Kiev
 Michel Lysight (b. 1958)
     Chronographie VIII for viola (or cello) and piano (2004); Alain Van Kerckhoven Éditeur; CeBeDeM
     Homage to Fibonacci for 2 violas (2004); Éditions Delatour; CeBeDeM
     Meditation for viola and guitar (or harp, or harpsichord, or marimba, or piano) (2009); Alain Van Kerckhoven Éditeur
     Samarkand for viola (or clarinet) and piano (or string quartet) (1992, 1995); Alain Van Kerckhoven Éditeur
     Septentrion for viola (or clarinet) and piano, or string quartet, or string orchestra (2005); Éditions Delatour; CeBeDeM
     Thrène for viola (or violin, or cello) and piano (1995); Alain Van Kerckhoven Éditeur
     Trois Croquis for viola (or violin, or cello) and piano (1990); Alain Van Kerckhoven Éditeur

M
 Ami Maayani (1936–2019)
     Concerto for viola and orchestra (1974); Israeli Music Publications
     Improvisation variée for flute, viola and harp (1966)
     Trio for flute, viola and harp (1969); revision of Improvisation variée; Lyra Music
 Andrew Paul MacDonald (b. 1958)
     The Great Square of Pegasus: "Algenib" for viola solo, Op. 42 (1997)
     Hymenaeus for violin and viola, Op. 38 (1996); Canadian Music Centre
     Pleiades Variations for flute, viola and harp, Op. 45 (1998); Canadian Music Centre
     Tapestries for viola and string orchestra, Op. 66 (2004)
 Otmar Mácha (1922–2006)
     Balada for viola and piano (1988); Český Hudební Fond
     Balada a finále (Ballade and Finale) for viola, piano and string orchestra (2000–2001); Český Hudební Fond
 Peter Machajdík (b. 1961)
     Behind the Waves for viola and string orchestra (2016)
     Munk for viola and piano (2013)
     Peroket for viola solo (1997, revised 2012)
     Halleluya for viola and soprano (2018)
 Tod Machover (b. 1953)
     Song of Penance for hyperviola, computer voice, and 17 instruments (1992)
 Steven Mackey (b. 1956)
     Groundswell (also Ground Swell), Concerto for viola and chamber ensemble (2007); Boosey & Hawkes
 James MacMillan (b. 1959)
     Concerto for viola and orchestra (2013); Boosey & Hawkes
     So Deep for mixed chorus with optional oboe and viola solos (1992); words by Robert Burns; Boosey & Hawkes
 Elizabeth Maconchy (1907–1994)
     Concerto for viola and orchestra (1937); Alfred Lengnick
     Conversations for clarinet and viola (1967–1968)
     3 Easy Duets for 2 violas (1972); Faber Music; G. Schirmer
     3 Easy Pieces for violin and viola (1972); Faber Music; G. Schirmer
     4 Easy Trios for 2 violins and viola or violin and 2 violas (1972); Faber Music
     5 Pieces for viola solo (1937)
     Romanza for viola and chamber ensemble (1979); Chester Music
     5 Sketches for viola solo (1983); Chester Music
     Sonata for viola and piano (1937–1938)
 Stuart MacRae (b. 1976)
     Equilibrium for viola and ensemble (flute, clarinet, violin, cello, piano) (2008); Novello & Co.
     fenodyree for viola solo (2015)
     The City Inside for viola and piano (1997); Novello & Co.
 Bruno Maderna (1920–1973)
     Viola for viola solo (1971); Ricordi
     Ständchen für Tini (Serenade for Tini) for viola and violin (1972); Edizioni Suvini Zerboni
 Trygve Madsen (b. 1940)
     Sonata for viola and piano, Op. 33 (1960s, published 1987); Musikk-Husets Forlag
 Jan Maegaard (1926–2012)
     Elegia, Nocturne for viola and string orchestra, Op. 108 (1999)
     Labirinto I for viola solo, Op. 77 (1986); Engstrøm & Sødring
     Quasi una sonata for viola and piano, Op. 14 (1952)
 Jef Maes (1905–1996)
     Andante rustique for viola and piano (1934); CeBeDeM
     Concerto for viola and orchestra (1937, 1943); CeBeDeM
     Divertimento for viola and piano (1966); CeBeDeM
     Intermezzo for viola and piano (1935); CeBeDeM
     Sonatine for flute and viola (1934); CeBeDeM
     Trio for violin, viola and percussion (1964); CeBeDeM
 Quinto Maganini (1897–1974)
     An Ancient Greek Melody for viola and piano (1945); Edition Musicus
     Concert Album: 14 Works arranged for viola and piano (1954); Edition Musicus
     Night Piece for viola and piano (1946); Edition Musicus
     Song of a Chinese Fisherman for viola and piano (1944); Edition Musicus
 Mary Mageau (1934–2020)
     Contrasts in Continuum for unaccompanied viola (1968); Australian Music Centre
     Preludes for Patricia, 4 Short Pieces for 2 violas or solo viola with prerecorded tape (1996); Australian Music Centre
     Statement and Variations for viola solo (1979); University of Michigan; Australian Music Centre
 Ester Mägi (1922–2021)
     Serenaad (Serenade) for flute, violin and viola (1982); Eres Edition
 Frederik Magle (b. 1977)
     Lament for viola and organ (2017)
 Ernst Mahle (b. 1929)
     As melodias da Cecília (The Songs of Cecília) for viola and piano (1972); Irmãos Vitale
     Concertino for viola and string orchestra (1978)
     Duetos modais (Modal Duets) for 2 violas (1991)
     Sonata for viola and piano (1968)
     Sonatina for viola and piano (1976)
     Sonatina for viola or cello and piano (1956)
 Claus-Steffen Mahnkopf (b. 1962)
     memor sum for viola solo (1989); Bärenreiter Verlag
     Trio basso for viola, cello and double bass (1995); Hans Sikorski

 Mesías Maiguashca (b. 1938)
     Plainte: "...unvermindert weiter..." ("...con la misma intensidad...") for accordion and viola (1993); Edition Modern; Tre Media Musikverlage
 René Maillard (1931–2012)
     Sonata No. 1 for viola and piano, Op. 5 (1952, revised 2009); Éditions Delatour
     Sonata No. 2 for viola and piano, Op. 18 (2003); Éditions Delatour
 Teisutis Makačinas (b. 1938)
     Dvi poemos (Two Poems) for flute, viola and string orchestra (1962); Muzyka
     Tango "Krintanti žvaigždė" (Tango "Falling Star") for viola and piano (2004) or for 8 violas, double bass, piano and percussion (2005); Lithuanian Music Information and Publishing Centre
 Andreas Makris (1930–2005)
     Concerto for viola and orchestra (1970)
 Maciej Małecki (b. 1940)
     Andante i allegro (Andante and Allegro) for viola and string quintet (or string orchestra) (2005)
 Gian Francesco Malipiero (1882–1973)
     Canto nell'infinito for viola and piano (1930); original for violin and piano; Éditions Alphonse Leduc
     Dialogo No. 5 "Quasi Concerto" for viola and orchestra (1956); Ricordi
 Riccardo Malipiero (1914–2003)
     Canti (Songs) for viola and orchestra (1978); Edizioni Suvini Zerboni
     Ciaccona di Davide for viola and piano (1970); Edizioni Suvini Zerboni
 Ursula Mamlok (1923–2016)
     From My Garden for viola solo (1965); C.F. Peters
     Music for Viola and Harp (1965); American Composers Alliance
 Özkan Manav (b. 1967)
     Partita for viola solo, Op. 4 (1991–1992, revised 2003)
 Joe Maneri (1927–2009)
     Osanj for viola solo (2004)
 Philip Maneval (b. 1956)
     Sonata for viola and piano, Op. 16
     Sonata for violin and viola, Op. 25 (2009); Theodore Presser Company
 Robert Mann (1920–2018)
     Invocation for violin and viola (1997); Merion Music; Theodore Presser Company
 Daan Manneke (b. 1939)
     Archipel II for viola, cello and double bass (1985); Donemus
     Quasi una fantasia a tre for flute, viola and harp (2004)
 Franco Mannino (1924–2005)
     Suoni Astrali (Astral Sounds) for 8 violas, Op. 245 (1985); Edipan Musical Editions
     Cinque romanze (Five Romances) for viola and orchestra, Op. 116 (1975); version for viola and string orchestra, Op. 116b (1999); Edizioni Curci
     Piccola Sonata (Little Sonata) for viola and piano, Op. 44 (1966); Casa Musicale Sonzagno
     Sonata for viola solo, Op. 64 (1970); Edizioni Curci
     Three Pieces for Viola (1983); Boccaccini & Spada
     Anxiety, Op. 234
     Tumult, Op. 235
     Peace, Op. 236
     Tre pezzi (Three Pieces) for viola solo (1990); Edizioni Curci
     Immagine, Op. 362
     Visione (sogno o realtà?), Op. 363
     Felicità, Op. 364
 Jeff Manookian (1953–2021)
     Diversions for violin and viola (2021); Windsor Editions
     Improvisations on Armenian Folk Songs for viola and orchestra (1999); Windsor Editions
     Lamentum for viola and piano (2019); Windsor Editions
     Nox for solo viola, harp and string orchestra (2014); Windsor Editions
     Sonata for viola and piano (2014); Windsor Editions
 Philippe Manoury (b. 1952)
     Partita I for viola and live electronics (2006)
 Tigran Mansurian (b. 1939)
     3 Arias for viola and large orchestra (2008)
     Concerto "...and then I was in time again..." for viola and 18 strings (1995); M.P. Belaïeff
     Confessing with Faith for 4 male voices and viola (1998)
     4 Hayrens for viola and piano (1967, 2007, revised 2010); original for mezzo-soprano and piano; M.P. Belaïeff
     Lacrymae for soprano saxophone and viola (1999); M.P. Belaïeff
     Lamento for viola solo (2002); M.P. Belaïeff
     Lied und Gebilde for viola and percussion (1998, revised 2000 and 2010); M.P. Belaïeff
     Ode an den Lotus (Ode to the Lotus) for viola solo (2012); commissioned work for the 2013 ARD International Music Competition; M.P. Belaïeff
     Sonata for viola and piano (1962); Muzyka; Hans Sikorski
 Bruno Mantovani (b. 1974)
     Concerto for 2 violas and orchestra (2009); Éditions Henry Lemoine
     Da Roma for clarinet, viola and piano (2005); Éditions Henri Lemoine
     Little Italy for viola solo (2005); Éditions Henri Lemoine
     Quelques effervescences for viola and piano (2006); Éditions Henri Lemoine
     Une autre incandescence for clarinet, viola and piano (1998); Éditions Henri Lemoine
 Giacomo Manzoni (b. 1932)
     Improvvisazione for viola and piano (1958); G. Ricordi
 Marin Marais (1656–1728)
     Chaconne for viola d'amore or viola and piano (1686); original for viola da gamba and basso continuo; transcription by Louis van Waefelghem (1893?)
     Sarabande for viola d'amore or viola and piano (1686); original for viola da gamba and basso continuo; transcription by Louis van Waefelghem (1893?)
 Myriam Marbe (1931–1997)
     Concerto for viola and orchestra (1977); Editura Muzicală
     Paos for viola and clarinet (1995)
     Sonata for viola and piano (1955)
     Sonata (Prologo – Aria – Epilogo) for 2 violas (1966); Editura Muzicală; Breitkopf & Härtel
     Sonata per due for flute and viola (1985)
     Souvenir d'un paysage inconnu for flute and viola (1979)
 Erich Marckhl (1902–1980)
     Musik (Music) for viola and piano (1941)
     Sonata for viola solo (1948)
     Sonata for viola and piano (1939)
 Tomás Marco (b. 1942)
     Dúo concertante No. 4 for viola and piano (1980)
     Trio concertante No. 2 for flute, violin and viola (1984)
 Henri Maréchal (1842–1924)
     Élégie for viola and piano (published 1931); Éditions Maurice Senart
 Tera de Marez Oyens (1932–1996)
     Möbius by Ear for viola and piano (1982); Donemus
 Alain Margoni (b. 1934)
     3 Eaux-fortes (3 Etchings) for viola and piano (1982); Éditions Gérard Billaudot; United Music Publishers
 Pierrette Mari (b. 1929)
     Ciel de bruyère (Sky of Heather) for viola and piano (1981); Éditions Gérard Billaudot; United Music Publishers
 Pierre Mariétan (b. 1935)
     Caractères for flute, viola and double bass (1961)
     Chamber Music No. 4: Traces, bribes et autres fragments for violin and viola (1981)
     Ersatz for viola solo (1961)
     Passages I–III for viola and cello (1961)
 Liviu Marinescu (b. 1970)
     Quodlibet Sonata for cello or viola solo (1996)
 Alexandros Markeas (b. 1965)
     5 Souvenirs involontaires (5 Involuntary Memories) for viola and cello (2004); Éditions Gérard Billaudot
     Télégraphiques for viola solo (2000)
 Albert Markov (b. 1933)
     Elegy for viola and piano (1994)
 Günther Marks (1897–1978)
     Jesu, meine Freude, Partita for viola and organ (1970); Hänssler-Verlag
     Mein schönste Zier und Kleinod bist, Partita for viola and organ (1977); Hänssler-Verlag
 Miklós Maros (b. 1943)
     An Arty-and-crafty Lilt for alto, viola (or cello) and piano (1976); Swedish Music Information Centre
     Claris for clarinet, viola and piano (1994); Swedish Music Information Centre
     Confabulation for flute, viola and guitar (1997); Swedish Music Information Centre
     Diptychon for viola and organ (1979); Svensk Musik; Swedish Music Information Centre
     Glädjebud (Good Tidings) for trumpet, violin and viola (1971); Swedish Music Information Centre
     Konzertmusik (Concert Music) for violin, viola and chamber ensemble (1992); Swedish Music Information Centre
     Partite for viola and piano (1991); Svensk Musik; Swedish Music Information Centre
     Violasonata for viola and live electronics (1970); Swedish Music Information Centre
 Wolfgang Marschner (1926–2020)
     Concerto for viola and string orchestra (premiere 2004)
     Deutsche Epigramme for 2 violas
     Nocturne for violin and viola
     Rhapsodie for viola solo
 Pamela J. Marshall (b. 1954)
     Rising for viola solo (2009); Spindrift Music
 Henri Marteau (1874–1934)
     Chaconne in C minor for viola and piano, Op. 8 (1905)
     Feuillet d'Album (Album Leaf) in D minor for viola and piano, Op. 2 No. 2
     Partita for flute and viola, Op. 42 No. 2
     Fünf Schilflieder for baritone, viola and piano, Op. 31; words by Nikolaus Lenau
 Carlo Martelli (b. 1935)
     Terzetto for 2 violins and viola, Op. 11 (1960); Alfred Lengnick
 Henri Martelli (1895–1980)
     Concertstück (Concert Piece) for viola and piano, Op. 97 (1961); Éditions Ricordi
     Sonata for viola and piano, Op. 93 (1959); Éditions Choudens
 Frank Martin (1890–1974)
     Ballade for viola, winds, harp, harpsichord, timpani and percussion (1972); Universal Edition
 Jorge Martín (b. 1959)
     Three Nocturnes for cello (or violin, or viola, or clarinet) and piano (1997)
 Philip Martin (b. 1947)
     Aria and Moto Perpetuo for viola and piano (1992); Ireland Contemporary Music Centre
     Fantasy "Footfalls Echo in the Memory" for flute, viola and harp (2008); Ireland Contemporary Music Centre
 Jean Paul Égide Martini (1741–1816)
     Plaisir d'Amour (1780); transcription for viola d'amore or viola and piano by Louis van Waefelghem
 Donald Martino (1931–2005)
     Three Dances for viola and piano, Op. 23 (1954); Dantalian
     Three Sad Songs for viola and piano (1993); Dantalian
 Jean Martinon (1910–1976)
     Concerto for viola and orchestra (1930s); Néocopie Musicale
     Rapsodie 72 for viola and piano, Op. 60 (1972); Éditions Gérard Billaudot
 Rolf Martinsson (b. 1956)
     Den hemliga liljan (The Secret Lily) for mezzo-soprano, viola and piano (1990); STIM; Swedish Music Information Centre
     Rosen for mezzo-soprano and viola (1995); STIM; Swedish Music Information Centre
     Tics for flute, viola and guitar, Op. 43 (1997); STIM; Swedish Music Information Centre
     Trio for clarinet, viola and piano (1986)
 Bohuslav Martinů (1890–1959)
     Concerto for string quartet and orchestra, H. 207 (1931); Panton; Schott Music
     Divertimento (Serenade No. 4) for violin, viola and chamber orchestra, H. 215 (1932)
     Duo No. 2 for violin and viola, H. 331 (1950); Éditions Max Eschig
     Ptačí hody (The Bird Feast) for children's chorus and trumpet (or viola), H. 379 (1959); Panton; Schott Music
     Rhapsódie-koncert (Rhapsody-Concerto) for viola and orchestra, H. 337 (1952); Bärenreiter-Verlag
     Sonata No. 1 for viola and piano, H. 355 (1955); Associated Music Publishers
     Tři madrigaly (Three Madrigals) [Duo No. 1] for violin and viola, H. 313 (1947); Boosey & Hawkes
 Karl Marx (1897–1985)
     Concerto for viola and orchestra, Op. 10 (1930?); Bote & Bock
 David Maslanka (1943–2017)
     Montana Music: Fantasy on a Chorale Tune for violin and viola (1993)
     Trio No. 2 for viola, clarinet and piano (1973); C. Fischer
 Benedict Mason (b. 1954)
     Concerto for the Viola Section, accompanied by the rest of the orchestra (1990); Chester Music
 Daniel Gregory Mason (1873–1953)
     Pastorale in D major for violin, clarinet (or viola) and piano, Op. 8 (1909–1912); Éditions Salabert
 Gérard Masson (b. 1936)
     Alto-tambour for violin, viola and 12 strings (1985)
     Duo for 2 violas; United Music Publishers
     Duo for violin and viola (1982)
     Mélisande 1 mètre 60 de désespoir for viola and piano (1990)
     W3A6M4 for violin, viola and chamber orchestra (1983); Éditions Salabert
 Piotr Maszyński (1855–1934)
     Romans (Romance) in A major for violin or viola and piano, Op. 10
 Martín Matalon (b. 1958)
     Formas de Arena for flute, viola and harp (2001); Gérard Billaudot
     Traces II for viola solo and live electronics (2005); Gérard Billaudot
     Trame VI for viola and chamber orchestra (2003); Gérard Billaudot
 Bruce Mather (b. 1939)
     Barbaresco for viola, cello and double bass (1984); Canadian Music Centre
     Dialogue pour Trio Basso et Orchestre for viola, cello, double bass and orchestra (1988); Canadian Music Centre
     Gattinara for viola and percussion (1982); Canadian Music Centre
     Viola Duet for 2 violas (1987); Canadian Music Centre
 William Mathias (1934–1992)
     Divertimento for violin and viola, Op. 1 (1954, revised 1992); Oxford University Press
     Zodiac Trio for flute, viola and harp, Op. 70 (1975); Oxford University Press
 Janez Matičič (1926–2022)
     Deux poèmes (2 Poems) for viola and piano (1949); Društvo Slovenskih Skladateljev
 Wenzeslaus Matiegka (1773–1830)
     Grand Trio for violin, viola and guitar, Op. 9
     Grand Trio for violin, viola and guitar, Op. 24
     Notturno in G major for flute, viola and guitar, Op. 21
     Serenade in C major for flute, viola and guitar, Op. 26
 Colin Matthews (b. 1946)
     3 Interludes for clarinet, viola and piano (1994); Faber Music
     4 Moods for viola and piano (1999, 2006); Faber Music
        Luminoso (2006)
        Oscuro (1999)
        Scorrevole (2006)
        Calmo (1999)
 David Matthews (b. 1943)
     Chant for solo viola (1997); Visible Music
     Danny's Dance for violin and viola (1989)
     Darkness Draws In for solo viola, Op. 102 (2005); Faber Music
     Double Concerto for violin, viola and orchestra, Op. 122 (2013); Faber Music
     Not Farewell for solo viola (2003); Visible Music
     Fantasia for solo viola, Op. 5 No. 1 (1970); Visible Music
     Winter Journey for solo viola, Op. 32a (1982–1983, 1999); Faber Music
     Winter Remembered for viola and string orchestra, Op. 86 (2001); Faber Music.
 Michael Matthews (b. 1950)
     and the sky caught for clarinet (bass clarinet), viola and piano (2012)
     3 Duos (Book I) for violin and viola (2005)
     Four Songs of Japan for soprano, viola and fortepiano (1991)
     Wondering for viola solo (2001); Canadian Music Centre
 Siegfried Matthus (1934–2021)
     Trio for flute, viola and harp (1971); Breitkopf & Härtel; Deutscher Verlag für Musik
     Unruhige Zeit, Trio for baryton, viola and cello (1990); Breitkopf & Härtel; Deutscher Verlag für Musik
     Wasserspiele for clarinet, viola and piano (2001); Breitkopf & Härtel; Deutscher Verlag für Musik
 Ludwig Wilhelm Maurer (1789–1878)
     Divertimento for viola and string orchestra, Op. 85 (1861)
 William Mayer (1925–2017)
     Twists for oboe and viola (2008); WillMayer Music
 Jacques Féréol Mazas (1782–1849)
     3 Duets for 2 violas, Op. 71; original for 2 violins; adaptation by Louis Pagels; International Music
     Élégie en ut (Elegy in C) for viola or cello and piano, Op. 73 (1838)
     La Consolation, Élégie No. 2 in G major for viola and orchestra (or piano), Op. 29 (1831)
     Le Songe (The Dream), Fantaisie on a Theme from Gaetano Donizetti's La favorite for viola or viola d'amore and piano, Op. 92 (c.1853)
 Jules Mazellier (1879–1959)
     Nocturne et Rondeau for viola and piano (1934); Éditions Costallat; Éditions Gerard Billaudot
 Rytis Mažulis (b. 1961)
     Canon perpetuus for 3 violas (2001); Lithuanian Music Information and Publishing Centre
     Dragma for 2 viola and piano (1995); Lithuanian Music Information and Publishing Centre
 John McCabe (1939–2015)
     Chamber Concerto for viola, cello and orchestra (1965); Novello
     Concerto Funèbre for viola and chamber orchestra (1962, revised 2006); Novello
     February Sonatina for viola solo (1990); Novello
     Musica Notturna for violin, viola and piano (1964); Novello
 Daniel William McCarthy (b. 1955)
     Chamber Suite for viola and chamber ensemble (2005); C. Alan Publications
     Testament for viola and piano (2003); C. Alan Publications
 Cecilia McDowall (b. 1951)
     Not Just a Place "dark memories from an old tango hall" for viola, double bass and piano (1999); McTier Music
     Upstaged for violin and viola (1998); Gemini Publications
 John Blackwood McEwen (1868–1948)
     Breath o' June for viola and piano (1913)
     Concerto for viola and orchestra (1901); Scottish Music Information Centre
     5 Preludes and a Fugue for violin and viola (1939, 1942); original version for 2 violins
     Sonata in A minor for viola and piano (1941); Scottish Music Information Centre
 Mike McFerron (b. 1970)
     Music for Viola and Piano (1996–1997); Red Earth Publishing
 Edward McGuire (b. 1948)
     Concerto for viola and string orchestra (1998); British Music Information Centre
     Divertimento for 20 solo violas (1979); British Music Information Centre
     Fastpeace III for viola and guitar (1982); British Music Information Centre
     Legend for viola and tape (1978); Scotus Music Publications; British Music Information Centre
     Martyr for viola solo (1972); Scottish Music Publishing
     Movement for flute, viola and harp (1979); British Music Information Centre
     Prelude 6 for viola solo (1981); British Music Information Centre
     Seven Modal Duets for viola and cello (1966, 1975); Scotus Music Publications; British Music Information Centre
     5 Songs for mezzo-soprano, viola and piano (1982); Scottish Music Centre
     Sounds Around for viola and percussion (1976, 1984); Scotus Music Publications; British Music Information Centre
     Three Dialogues for viola and double bass (1987); British Music Information Centre
 Diana McIntosh (b. 1937)
     Gut Reaction for viola and tape (1986); Canadian Music Centre
     Nanuk: Inuit for White Bear for viola and piano (1991); Canadian Music Centre
 George Frederick McKay (1899–1970)
     Ballade for viola
     Suite for viola and piano (1948); G. F. McKay Music Publishing
     Tlingit: Suite on Alaskan Indian Songs and Dances for viola and piano; original for violin and piano; McGinnis and Mark Music Publishers; Pietro Diero Publications
 Elliott Miles McKinley (b. 1969)
     A Few (Very) Late Hours for viola and electric piano (2005)
     Solo-Tude for viola solo (2005)
     Sonata for viola and piano (1991)
 William Thomas McKinley  (1938–2015)
     Ancient Memories, Chamber Concerto for viola and chamber ensemble (1989)
     Concerto No. 1 for viola and orchestra (1984)
     Concerto No. 2 for viola and orchestra
     Concerto No. 3 for viola and orchestra (1992); MMC Publications
     Concerto Fantasy for viola and orchestra (1978)
     Concert Variations for violin, viola and orchestra (1993)
     Little Sonata for viola, clarinet and piano (1973)
     Portraits for viola solo (1973)
     Samba for viola and piano (1984)
     Sonata No. 1 for viola and piano (1984)
     Trio for 2 violins and viola (1971)
     Trio Appassionato for clarinet, viola and piano (1982)
     Waves, Study for viola solo (1973)
 John McLeod (1934–2022)
     Canto Per Tre for mezzo-soprano, viola and piano (1972); Scottish Music Centre
     2 Carols for mezzo-soprano, viola and piano (1975)
 Lansing McLoskey (b. 1964)
     Wild Bells for viola and piano (1999); Odhecaton Z Music
 Gordon McPherson (b. 1965)
     Haar for solo viola, string orchestra, harp and percussion (1986–1987); Oxford University Press
 Cindy McTee (b. 1953)
     Circle Music I for viola and piano (1988); MMB Music; Lauren Keiser Music Publishing
 Tilo Medek (1940–2006)
     Sonata for viola and piano (1981); Moeck Verlag
     Variationen ohne Thema (Variations without Theme) for violin and viola (or cello) (2001–2002); Edition Tilo Medek
 Paul Méfano (1937–2020)
     Instantanée for viola solo (2005); Éditions Musicales Européennes
 André Mehmari (b. 1977)
     Sonata in C (Sonata em Dó) for viola and piano (2015)
 Jost Meier (1939–2022)
     Variations for viola and chamber orchestra (1996); Editions Bim
 Chiel Meijering (b. 1954)
     Ahnung des Endes for viola, chorus and orchestra (1985); Donemus
     Amber and Cream for viola and accordion (2007)
     Another Day Dies on a Gull's Cry for viola and guitar Trio (1989); Donemus
     Bumelen Gehen for viola and accordion (2007)
     Do You Want Me to Turn Your Floppy? for viola and harp (2006); Donemus
     Dreamtime – No Rhyme No Reason, Part 3 for viola, guitar trio and tape (1987); Donemus
     Handgeld for oboe (or flute), viola and guitar (1987, revised 1991); Donemus
     Little Box of Serenity for flute, guitar and viola (1997); Donemus
     Niet in de zon en droog bewaren for viola, double bass and accordion (1990); Donemus
     Nini for viola and guitar (1986, revised 1987); Donemus
     Pithycanthropus erectus for viola and piano (1994); Donemus
     Ready to Go Again! for viola, double bass and accordion (1991); Donemus
     Romantic Aberration for viola and harp (2006); Donemus
     The Swing of the Thing for viola, double bass and accordion (1990); Donemus
     Two Can Play for violin and viola (2003); Donemus
     Variation on a Variation by Franz Liszt on a Waltz Tune of Anton Diabelli for violin and viola (2003); Donemus
     Violaconcerto (Ahnung des Endes, Part 3) for viola, chorus and orchestra (1985); Donemus
     Winds of Change – No Rhyme No Reason, Part 2 for viola and guitar trio (1987); Donemus
 John Melby (b. 1941)
     Concerto No. 1 for viola and computer (1982); Merion Music; American Composers Alliance
     Concerto No. 2 for viola and computer (2009); American Composers Alliance
 Wilfrid Mellers (1914–2008)
     Sonata for viola and piano (1946); Alfred Lengnick
     Songs of Sleep, Three Lullabies for tenor voice, viola and piano; Frog Peak Music
 Jacques de Menasce (1905–1960)
     Sonate en un mouvement for viola and piano (1955); Éditions Durand; Elkan-Vogel
 Alfred Mendelssohn (1910–1966)
     Concerto for viola and orchestra (1965); Uniunea, Bucharest
     Petite Suite for viola solo (1933); Uniunea, Bucharest
 Felix Mendelssohn (1809–1847)
     Canon in E major for 2 violas, MWV Y 7 (1831); American Viola Society Publications
     Sonata in C minor for viola and piano, MWV Q 14 (1823–1824)
     Trio in C minor for violin, viola and piano, MWV Q 3 (1820)
 Gilberto Mendes (1922–2016)
     Per sonar a tre for 2 violins and viola (1978); Editora Universidade de Brasília
 Max Méreaux (b. 1946)
     Bella Donna for viola solo (2010); Éditions Armiane Fortin
     Dualitude for viola and piano (2006); Éditions Pierre Lafitan
     Heureux présage (Good Omen) for viola and piano (2003); Éditions Pierre Lafitan
     Idylle for viola solo (2004); Editions Combre; United Music Publishers
     Ikebana for viola and orchestra (2017); Éditions Fertile Plaine
     Invocation for viola and piano (2002); Editions Combre; United Music Publishers
     Le vieux château (The Old Castle) for viola and piano (2003); Éditions Pierre Lafitan
     Préludes à trois légendes (Preludes to Three Legends) for viola solo (2006); Éditions Delatour France
     Remember for viola and piano (2005); Éditions Pierre Lafitan
     Rêverie for viola and piano (2005); Éditions Musicales Auguste Zurfluh
 Usko Meriläinen (1930–2004)
     Trauerlied for viola solo (1962); Finnish Music Information Centre
 Pavle Merkù (1927–2014)
     Alba, Monologue for viola solo (1986); Pizzicato-Verlag Helvetia
 Michel Merlet (b. 1939)
     Ostinato for viola and piano, Op. 37 (1986); Collection Panorama: Œuvres Contemporaines, Volume 2 (1987); Éditions Gérard Billaudot
 Frank Merrick (1886–1981)
     Sonata for viola and piano; British Music Information Centre
 Arthur Meulemans (1884–1966)
     Concerto for viola and orchestra (1942); CeBeDeM
     Sonata for flute, viola and harp (1948); CeBeDeM
     Sonata for viola and piano (1953); CeBeDeM
 Ernst Hermann Meyer (1905–1988)
     Concerto for viola and orchestra (1978); Edition Peters
     Essay for viola solo (1983); Edition Peters
     Poem for viola and orchestra (1961); Breitkopf & Härtel
     Sonata for viola and piano (1979); Edition Peters
 Krzysztof Meyer (b. 1943)
     Hommage à Nadia Boulanger for flute, viola and harp, Op. 17 (1967–1971, revised 1991); Wydawnictwo Muzyczne Agencji Autorskiej
 Max Meyer-Olbersleben (1850–1927)
     Concerto in D major for viola and orchestra, Op. 112
     Elegiac Sonata for viola, cello and piano, Op. 113
     Sonata in C major for viola (viola alta) and piano, Op. 14 (1881)
 Carlos Micháns (b. 1950)
     Rapsodía for viola solo (1983); Donemus
     Sinfonia Concertante No. 4 for violin, viola and orchestra (2002); Donemus
     Sonata for viola solo (1993); Donemus
     Trois étoffes anciennes (3 Old Fabrics) for viola and piano (2003); Donemus
 Paul-Baudouin Michel (1930–2020)
     Mystère-jeu for viola and piano (1976); CeBeDeM
 Michel Michelet – Михаил Исаакович Левин (1894–1995)
     Eisenbach suite for violin and cello (or viola) (1950)
     Poem for viola and piano (1951)
     Sonata for viola and piano (1959)
 Peter Mieg (1906–1990)
     Doris for viola solo (1977); Musik Verlag Nepomuk
     Duo for flute and viola (1977); Amadeus Verlag
 Costin Miereanu (b. 1943)
     Solo VII for viola solo (1995); Éditions Salabert
 Francisco Mignone (1897–1986)
     Três Valsas Brasileiras (3 Brazilian Waltzes) for viola and piano (1968)
 Georges Migot (1891–1976)
     Au bord de l'Eure, 5 Aquarelles for violin, viola and piano (1917); Édition Maurice Senart
     Estampie for viola and piano (1925); Alphonse Leduc
     Introduction for viola and piano (1928)
     Sonata for viola solo (1958); Amis de l'œuvre et de la pensée de Georges Migot; SEDIM
     Suite à deux for English horn (or clarinet, or viola) and cello (1963); Amis de l'œuvre et de la pensée de Georges Migot; SEDIM
     Suite en trois mouvements for 2 recorders or violin and viola (1957); Bärenreiter-Verlag
     Trio for violin, viola and piano (1918); Alphonse Leduc; Éditions Maurice Senart
 Marcel Mihalovici (1898–1985)
     Sonata for viola and piano, Op. 47 (1948); Heugel
     Sonata for viola solo, Op. 110 (1980); Éditions Salabert
     Textes for viola and piano, Op. 104 (1975); Heugel
 András Mihály (1917–1993)
     Brácsa-rapszódia (Viola Rhapsody) for viola and piano (1947); Magyar Kórus Budapest; Editio Musica Budapest
     Musica per Viola for viola with piano accompaniment (1975); Editio Musica Budapest
 Yvar Mikhashoff (1941–1993)
     Concerto for viola and orchestra (1968, revised 1976)
 Louis-Toussaint Milandre (18th century)
     Andante et Menuet (1770); arrangement for viola d'amore or viola and piano by Louis van Waefelghem
 Ella Milch-Sheriff (b. 1954)
     Duo for violin and viola (1976); Israel Music Institute
     Longing (געגועים) for viola solo (2005)
     4 Miniatures (ארבע מיניאטורות) for viola solo and 2 violas (2005); Israel Music Institute
     Touches (נגיעות) for violin and viola (2007)
 Miroslav Miletić (1925–2018)
     À Naruhito & Masako: Uspavanka (Komoriuta / 子守唄 / Lullaby) for viola and piano (2001); M. Miletić, Zagreb
     Concerto for viola and chamber orchestra (1958); M. Miletić, Zagreb
     Concerto Grosso iz ciklusa "Lijepa naša" (Concerto Grosso from the Cycle "Our Lovely Croatia") for viola and string orchestra (2005); Cantus Publishing
     Duo for viola and cello (2010)
     Epitaf za Pepina (Epitaph for Pepin; Epitaffio per Pepin) for viola and string orchestra (2008); M. Miletić, Zagreb
     Fantazija na teme B. Brittena (Fantasia on Themes by Benjamin Britten) for viola and piano (1993); M. Miletić, Zagreb
     Istarski način (In the Istrian Style), Trio for flute, clarinet and viola (1984); Društvo Skladatelja Hrvatske
     Iz kajdanke A. Dobronića: prisjecánje na dječje zborove (From the Music Manuscript of Antun Dobronić: Reflections on Children's Choruses) for viola and piano (1997)
     Kroateska (Croatesque) for viola solo (2001); M. Miletić, Zagreb
     Lament for viola and electronic sounds (1963)
     Male skladbe (Miniatures) for viola and piano; Z. Kolarić, Zagreb
     Monodia for viola solo (1990); Bärenreiter
     Monolog (Monologue) for viola and piano (1965); Edition Pax, Zagreb
     Rapsodija (Rhapsodie) for viola and piano (1955); Edition Pax, Zagreb
     Sonata for viola and piano (1981); Edition Pax, Zagreb
 Robin Milford (1903–1959)
     Elegiac Meditation for viola and string orchestra, Op. 83 (1946–1947); Oxford University Press
     Four Pieces for viola and piano, Op. 42 (1935)
          Air; Oxford University Press
 Darius Milhaud (1892–1974)
     Concertino d'été for viola and chamber orchestra, Op. 311 (1951); Heugel
     Concerto [No. 1] for viola and orchestra of soloists, Op. 108 (1929); Universal Edition
     Concerto No. 2 for viola and orchestra, Op. 240 (1954–1955); Heugel
     Élégie pour Pierre for viola, timpani and 2 percussionists, Op. 416 (1965); Gems Music Publications
     Quatre Visages for viola and piano, Op. 238 (1944); Heugel
          La Californienne
          The Wisconsonian
          La Bruxelloise
          La Parisienne
     Sonata No. 1 for viola and piano, Op. 240 (1944); Heugel
     Sonata No. 2 for viola and piano, Op. 244 (1944); Heugel
     Sonatine for violin and viola, Op. 226 (1941); Mercury Music Corporation
     Sonatine for viola and cello, Op. 378 (1959); Heugel
     Suite for violin, viola and piano, Op. 157b (1936); Éditions Salabert
 Richard Mills (b. 1949)
     Concerto for violin, viola and chamber orchestra (1993); Australian Music Centre
 Vlado Milošević (1901–1990)
     Preludij i elegija (Prelude and Elegy) for viola solo (1970)
     Sonata for viola and piano (1967); Udruzenje Kompozitora Bosne i Hercegovine
 İlhan Mimaroğlu (1926–2012)
     Idols of Perversity for solo viola and string ensemble (1974); Seesaw Music
     Monologlar (Monologue) for clarinet and viola (1997)
 Georgi Minchev (b. 1939)
     Monodia and Concerto Grosso for viola, harpsichord, percussion and string orchestra (2006); Editions Bim
     Monodia II for viola or cello solo (2006)
 Khayyam Mirzazade (1935–2018)
      Genesis, Sonata for viola solo (1982); Sovetsky Kompozitor
 Eric Moe (b. 1954)
     And Life Like Froth Doth Throb for viola and cello (1997); Dead Elf Music; Subito Music
     Preamble & Dreamsong from the 4–5 a.m. REM Stage for alto flute or viola and piano (2003)
 Albert Moeschinger (1897–1985)
     Introduzione e scherzo for 2 violins and viola (1933)
     Portrait of Emmy, Trio for 2 violins and viola (1967); Müller & Schade
 Robert Moevs (1920–2007)
     Variazioni sopra una melodia (Variations on a Melody) for viola and cello (1961); Piedmont Music
 Roderich Mojsisovics von Mojsvár (1877–1953)
     Sonata in C minor for viola (or violin) and piano, Op. 74 (1927); Musikverlag Ludwig Krenn
 Roberto Molinelli (b. 1963)
     Chanson antique for flute, viola and harp (1986)
     Elegia per Manhattan (Elegy for Manhattan) for viola, cello and string orchestra (2001)
     Milonga para Astor for viola, cello and string orchestra (1988)
     Montessoriana, Cantata for soprano, narrator, viola, children's chorus and orchestra (2000); words by Paolo Peretti
     Movie Concerto: Scene scritte in forma di colonna sonora, Divertissement-Concerto for viola and orchestra (1999)
     Once upon a Memory for viola, piano, percussion and string orchestra (2007)
     Tosca: "Tu a me una vita... io a te chieggo un istante!", Fantasia-Story on the opera Tosca by Giacomo Puccini for viola and string orchestra (1997)
 Francesco Molino (1768–1847)
      3 Trios for flute, viola and guitar, Op. 4 (1812)
      Grand Trio Concertant for flute (or violin), viola and guitar, Op. 30
      Grand Trio Concertant for flute (or violin), viola and guitar, Op. 45
 Simon Molitor (1766–1848)
      Trio for violin (or flute), viola and guitar, Op. 6 (1806)
 Carl Christian Møller (1823–1893)
     Lykkelig for viola (or cello) and orchestra
 Henry Mollicone (1946–2022)
     Chaunt for viola solo (1972); E.C. Schirmer Music
     Two Love Songs for tenor and viola (1969); ECS Publishing; American Composers Alliance
 Fred Momotenko (b. 1970)
     Eneato for viola (or violin) solo (2003) 
 José Pablo Moncayo (1912–1958)
     Sonata for viola and piano (1934); Ediciones Mexicanas de Música
 Barbara Monk Feldman (b. 1953)
     Movement for solo viola (1979); Canadian Music Centre
 Marc Monnet (b. 1947)
     Fantasia Bruta for viola solo (1982); Ricordi
 Stephen Montague (b. 1943)
     Facing the Fire for violin and viola (2004); United Music Publishers
 Pierre Monteux (1875–1964)
     Arabesque in D major for viola and piano (1920); Éditions Salabert
     Mélodie for viola and piano; Éditions Salabert
 Xavier Montsalvatge (1912–2002)
     Pregària a Santiago for viola and piano (1999); Tritó
 Ivan Moody (b. 1964)
     Klama for viola and double bass (1996)
     Vigil of the Angels for viola and string orchestra (1992)
 Dorothy Rudd Moore (1940–2022)
     Moods for viola and cello (1969); American Composers Alliance
 Arie Van de Moortel (1918–1976)
     Fantasia sopra la canzone "All voll" (Fantasy on the Song "All voll") for viola (or cello, or double bass) and orchestra (or piano), Op. 44 (1970); J. Maurer Edition Musicale; CeBeDeM
     Faust et Don Juan for viola and piano, Op. 29 (1965); CeBeDeM
     Loin des torches de Prague (Far from the Torches of Prague) for narrator, viola and piano, Op. 48 (1973); CeBeDeM
     Nocturne for viola and orchestra (or piano), Op. 18 (1956); J. Maurer Edition Musicale; CeBeDeM
     Sonata for viola and piano, Op. 14 (1955); J. Maurer Edition Musicale; CeBeDeM
 Guy Morançon (b. 1927)
     Salicornes for viola and piano; Le Chant du Monde
 Oskar Morawetz (1917–2007)
     Sonata for harp and viola (1985); Canadian Music Centre
 Norbert Moret (1921–1998)
     Veni Sancte Spititus for viola and organ (1990); Edition Norbert Moret
 Saburō Moroi (1903–1977)
     Sonata for viola and piano, Op. 11 (1935)
 Andrea Morricone (b. 1964)
     Nello Sguardo for viola and string orchestra (2012)
 Ennio Morricone (1928–2020)
     Il sogno di un uomo ridicolo for violin, viola (or 2 violas) and speaker (1997); Edizioni Suvini Zerboni
     Ombra di lontana presenza for viola, string orchestra and tape (1997); Edizioni Suvini Zerboni
     Scie for vibraphone, viola and tape
     Suoni per Dino for viola and 2 magnetophones (1969); Éditions Salabert
 Robert Morris (b. 1943)
     Entanglements for viola and computer-generated sounds (1998); Morris Music
     The Rest Stop for viola solo (2001); Morris Music
 Virgilio Mortari (1902–1993)
     Concerto dell'osservanza for viola and orchestra (1965); Ricordi
     Meditazione for oboe, viola and harp (1992); Rugginenti
 Lodewijk Mortelmans (1868–1952)
     Romanza for viola and piano (1935); original for violin and piano; CeBeDeM
 Finn Mortensen (1922–1983)
     Sonatina for viola solo, Op. 14 (1958); Music Information Centre Norway
     Sonatina for viola and piano, Op. 18 (1959); Music Information Centre Norway
 Luca Mosca (b. 1957)
     Sinfonia Concertante for violin, viola and string orchestra, Op. 64 (1993); Edizioni Suvini Zerboni
 Alexander Mosolov (1900–1973)
     3 Lyric Pieces (Три лирические пьесы) for viola and piano, Op. 2 (1922–1923); also published as 3 Esquisses
     Sonata for viola solo, Op. 21a (c.1925)
 David Moule-Evans (1905–1988)
     Moto Perpetuo for viola and piano (1938); Joseph Williams; Mills Music
 Wolfgang Amadeus Mozart (1756–1791)
     Duo No. 1 in G major for violin and viola, K. 423 (1783)
     Duo No. 2 in B major for violin and viola, K. 424 (1783)
     Sinfonia Concertante in E major for violin, viola and orchestra, K. 364 (K. 320d) (1779)
     "Kegelstatt" Trio in E major for clarinet, viola and piano, K. 498 (1786)
 Marjan Mozetich (b. 1948)
     Baroque Diversions for viola solo (1985); Jaymar Publications; Canadian Music Centre
     Dancing Strings, Suite of 6 Pieces for viola and piano (1980, revised 2005); Canadian Music Centre
     Disturbances for viola solo (1974); Canadian Music Centre
     Goodbye My Friend, Triptych for flute, viola and harp (2000); Canadian Music Centre
     Survival for viola solo (1979); Canadian Music Centre
     Trio in Jest for clarinet, viola and piano (1983); Canadian Music Centre
     A Veiled Dream for flute, viola and harp (1977); Canadian Music Centre
     Water Music for flute, viola and cello (1979); Canadian Music Centre
 Geraldine Mucha (1917–2012)
     Sonatina for viola (1945)
 Nico Muhly (b. 1981)
     Concerto for viola and orchestra (2014); St. Rose Music Publishing
     Drones and Viola for viola and piano (2011); St. Rose Music Publishing
     Duet No 1: Chorale Pointing Downwards for viola and cello (2003); St. Rose Music Publishing
     Keep in Touch for viola solo and electronics (2004); St. Rose Music Publishing
     Three Etudes for Viola for viola and tape; St. Rose Music Publishing
 August Eberhard Müller (1767–1817)
     Romance pathétique for viola and piano; transcription by Louis Pagels (1895); Louis Oertel
 Fabian Müller (b. 1964)
     The Mysterious Mr. Harley Quin for violin, viola and piano (2011)
     Sonata for viola and piano (2012)
     Suite for viola and string orchestra (or piano) (2004)
 Thomas Müller (b. 1939)
     Maqam for oboe (English horn) and viola (1987); Verlag Neue Musik
 Detlev Müller-Siemens (b. 1957)
     Concerto for viola and orchestra (1983–1984); Ars Viva Verlag; Schott Musik International
     distant traces for violin, viola and piano (2007); Schott Musik International
     Doppelkonzert (Double Concerto) for violin, viola and orchestra (1992); Ars Viva Verlag; Schott Musik International
 Jan Müller-Wieland (b. 1966)
     Himmelfahrt for viola solo (2003); Hans Sikorski
 Florentine Mulsant (b. 1962)
     Sonata for viola and piano, Op. 20 (1999); Furore Verlag
     Thème et variations (Theme and Variations) for viola solo, Op. 62 (2016); Furore Verlag
     Vocalise for viola solo, Op. 53 (2014); Furore Verlag
 Jeffrey Mumford (b. 1955)
     the clarity of remembered springs for solo viola (1992–1993); Theodore Presser Company
     eight aspects of appreciation for violin and viola (1996, revised 2000); Theodore Presser Company
     revisiting variazioni elegiaci for solo viola (2001); Theodore Presser Company
     wending for solo viola (2001); Theodore Presser Company
 Gerhart Münch (1907–1988)
     Tacambarenses III for viola and piano (1961); Ediciones Coral Moreliana, Morelia, Mexico
     Tessellata Tacambarensia No. 8 (Emanationes Tacambarenses) for English horn, viola and vibraphone (1974); Ediciones Coral Moreliana, Morelia, Mexico
 Isabel Mundry (b. 1963)
     Vent contraire for 2 violas (1999); Breitkopf & Härtel
 Tristan Murail (b. 1947)
     C'est un jardin secret, ma sœur, ma fiancée, une fontaine close, une source scellée... for viola solo (1976); Éditions Musicales Transatlantiques
     La Dérive des continents for viola and string orchestra (1973); Éditions Henry Lemoine
     Où tremblent les contours for 2 violas (1970); Rideau Rouge; Éditions Henry Lemoine
 Herbert Murrill (1909–1952)
     Four French Nursery Songs (Jeux de nourrices) for viola and piano (1942); Chester Music
 Thea Musgrave (b. 1928)
     Concerto for viola and orchestra (1973); Novello & Co.
     Elegy for viola and cello (1970); Novello & Co.
     From One to Another I for viola and tape (1970); Novello & Co.
     From One to Another II for viola and string orchestra (1970); Novello & Co.
     In the Still of the Night for viola solo (1997); Novello & Co.
     Lamenting with Ariadne for chamber orchestra (with viola solo) (1999); Novello & Co.
 Modest Mussorgsky (1839–1881)
     Hopak (Гопак) from the opera The Fair at Sorochyntsi (1874–1880); 1944 transcription for viola and piano by Vadim Borisovsky; Declaration of Love: Album of Popular Pieces for Viola and Piano (Страстное Признание: Альбом Популярных Пьес), Muzyka
 Emanuele Muzio (1821–1890)
     Andante e Rondoletto for viola and piano (1858)

N
 Šarūnas Nakas (b. 1962)
     Arcanum for viola and organ (1987) or viola with flute, violin, cello and synthesizer (1996); Lithuanian Music Information and Publishing Centre
 Émile Naoumoff (b. 1962)
     Petite suite for viola and piano (1984); Edition Schott
     Sonata for viola and piano (2001, revised 2009); Edition Schott
 Jacopo Napoli (1911–1994)
     Ricercare for viola solo; Edizioni Curci
 Onutė Narbutaitė (b. 1956)
     Aštuonstygė (The Eight-String) for violin and viola (1986); Lithuanian Music Information and Publishing Centre
 Masakazu Natsuda (b. 1968)
     Lonc tans me sui tenu de chanter, mes... (長いこと私は歌わずにやってきた、しかし...) for alto flute and viola (2008)
     2 Pièces (2つの小品) for horn and viola (2008)
 Jérôme Naulais (b. 1951)
     À l'aube... for viola and piano; Éditions Robert Martin
     La-Mi calmant for viola and piano; Éditions Robert Martin
     Sur le ton de la confidence for viola and piano (2004); Éditions Robert Martin
     Un rayon de lumière for viola and piano (2004); Éditions Pierre Lafitan
 Ernst Naumann (1832–1910)
     Drei Fantasie-Stücke (3 Fantasy Pieces) for cello (or viola) and piano, Op. 4 (1861)
     Drei Fantasie-Stücke (3 Fantasy Pieces) for viola and piano, Op. 5 (1861)
     Sonata in G minor for viola and piano, Op. 1 (1854)
     Trio in F minor for violin, viola and piano, Op. 7 (1863)
 Lior Navok (b. 1971)
     Dripping Minutes - Frozen Years, for viola and piano (2017)
 Oskar Nedbal (1874–1930)
     Romantisches Stück (Romantic Piece) for viola and piano, Op. 18 (1910); original for cello and piano, arrangement by the composer; Verlag Doblinger
 Marc Neikrug (b. 1946)
     Concerto for viola and orchestra (1974); Chester Music
 Václav Nelhýbel (1919–1996)
     Concerto for viola and orchestra (1981); Barta Music
     Counterpoint No. 3 for viola and double bass (1979); Barta Music; Ludwig Music Publishing
     Variations on a Slovak Folk Song for 2 violas (1974); E.C. Kerby; Alliance Publications
 Daniel Nelson (b. 1965)
     Romantatronic for solo viola, string orchestra, celesta and percussion (2000); Swedish Music Information Centre
 Octavian Nemescu (1940–2020)
     Cumpana porţii (Le chadouf de la porte) for viola (or double bass), percussion and tape (1976)
     Metabizantinirikon for viola and tape (1984)
     A T for saxophones, viola and tape (2008)
 Jon Øivind Ness (b. 1968)
     Gust for viola and double bass (2006); Music Information Centre Norway
     Snowblind for viola and chamber orchestra (2008); Music Information Centre Norway
 Josef Nešvera (1842–1914)
     Lipnická "ukolébavka" for viola (or violin) and piano (published 1907); Adolf Švarc v Kutné Hoře
 Franz Christoph Neubauer (c.1760–1795)
     4 Duos for violin and viola, Op. 5
     3 Duos for violin and viola, Op. 10
     3 Sonatas for violin and viola
 Olga Neuwirth (b. 1968)
     Remnants of Songs ... an Amphigory for viola and orchestra (2009); Boosey & Hawkes
 Maria Newman (b. 1962)
     Dances for Deliverance for viola solo (1993)
     Hansen Suite, Four Hymns for viola choir (1999, revised 2006)
 Sidney Newman (1906–1971)
     A Song of Sleep for tenor and viola, Op. 7 (1929); words by W. H. Davies; Scottish Music Centre
 George Newson (b. 1932)
     From the New Divan for viola, mixed chorus and orchestra (1982, 1993); words by Edwin Morgan; Alfred Lengnick
 Casimir Ney (1801–1877)
     Fantaisie brillante for viola and piano, Op. 12
     Fantaisie sur la Sicilienne de A. Gouffé for violin or viola and piano, Op. 25 (1856)
     Polka brillante et facile for 2 violas (1860)
     24 Préludes dans les 24 tons de la gamme (24 Preludes in All Keys) for viola solo, Op. 22 (published c.1849–1853)
     1er Quadrille brillant for flute or viola and piano (1842)
     Voir Callaunt, Pièce de salon for violin or viola and piano (1856)
 Dimitri Nicolau (1946–2008)
     In Singing and Complaint (... nel canto e nel lamento) for viola solo, Op. 62 (1986); Edipan Musical Editions
     Nyctes for viola solo and chamber ensemble, Op. 97 (1991); J. Trekel Musikverlag
     Sehnsuchtkonzert for viola and large orchestra, Op. 122
     Single with Variations for viola solo, Op. 152; Mnemes
     Sonata for viola and harp, Op. 252
     Strassenmusik Nr. 4 (Street Music No. 4) for viola soloist equipped with bass drum and hit hat, Op. 51 No. 4
     Strassenmusik Nr. 6 (Street Music No. 6) for viola, cello and referee whistle, Op. 51 No. 6
     Volti Mediterranei with viola concertante and chamber orchestra, Op. 266
 Carl Nielsen (1865–1931)
     Tro og håb spiller (Faith and Hope Are Playing) from Moderen for flute and viola, Op. 41, FS 94 (1920); Edition Wilhelm Hansen
 Tage Nielsen (1929–2003)
     Salon for flute, viola and harp (1984); Edition Samfundet
     A Sentimental Journey for percussion and viola (2002); Edition Samfundet
 Lewis Nielson (b. 1950)
     An die Ferne for solo viola (1980); American Composers Alliance
     Concerto for viola and orchestra (1980); American Composers Alliance
     Lizard Blizzard for solo viola (2002); American Composers Alliance
     Music for viola and piano (1982); American Composers Alliance
 Serge Nigg (1924–2008)
     Concerto No. 1 for viola and orchestra (1987–1988); Éditions Gérard Billaudot
     Concerto No. 2 for viola and orchestra (2000); Éditions Gérard Billaudot
 Phil Nimmons (b. 1923)
     Interlude for viola and piano (1951); Canadian Music Centre
 Joaquín Nin (1879–1949)
     Chants d'espagne for viola and piano (1986); arrangement for viola and piano by David Dalton; Éditions Max Eschig
 Akira Nishimura (b. 1953)
     Canon Waves (波のカノン) for viola quartet (1994)
     Concerto "Flame and Shadow" (焔と影) for viola and orchestra (1996); Zen-On Music Company
     Concerto for viola and string orchestra (2002); Zen-On Music Company
     Fantasia on "Song of the Birds" (「鳥の歌」による幻想曲) for viola solo (2005); Zen-On Music Company
     Sakura (桜) for 8 violas (2011); Schott Japan
     Sonata I "Whirl Dance" (無伴奏ヴィオラ･ソナタ第1番〈旋回舞踊〉) for viola solo (2005); Zen-On Music Company
     Sonata II "Mantra on the C-String" (無伴奏ヴィオラ･ソナタ第2番〈C線のマントラ〉) for viola solo (2007); Zen-On Music Company
 Roger Nixon (1921–2009)
     Concerto for viola and orchestra (1969); Carl Fischer
     Elegiac Rhapsody for viola and orchestra
     Four Duos for violin (or flute, or oboe) and viola (published 1966); Theodore Presser Company
 Marlos Nobre (b. 1939)
     Desafio I (Challenge I) for viola and string orchestra, Op. 31 No. 1 (1968); Tonos International
     Poema II for viola and piano, Op. 94 No. 2 (2002)
     Sonata for viola solo, Op. 11 (1963); Tonos Musikverlage
 David Noon (b. 1946)
     Duo for 2 violas, Op. 19 (1968); Carl Fischer
 Erik Nordgren (1913–1992)
     Arioso for solo viola and Orchestra, Op. 2 (1942); STIM; Swedish Music Information Centre
     Medley of Swedish Folk Tunes for viola and piano (1949); STIM; Swedish Music Information Centre
 Pehr Henrik Nordgren (1944–2008)
     Concerto No. 1 for viola and orchestra, Op. 12 (1970); Finnish Music Information Centre
     Concerto No. 2 for viola and orchestra, Op. 48 (1979); Finnish Music Information Centre
     Concerto No. 3 for viola and chamber orchestra, Op. 68 (1986); Finnish Music Information Centre
     Concerto for viola, double bass and chamber orchestra, Op. 87 (1993); Finnish Music Information Centre
 Arne Nordheim (1931–2010)
     Brudd (Fracture) for viola solo (2001); Edition Wilhelm Hansen
     Duplex for violin and viola (1990); Edition Wilhelm Hansen
     Partita for viola, harpsichord and percussion (1963); Edition Wilhelm Hansen
     Tenebrae for cello (or viola) and chamber orchestra (1981–1982, 2001); Edition Wilhelm Hansen
 Jesper Nordin (b. 1971)
     El pajaro con la quijada de burro (The Bird with the Donkey Jawbone) for violin, viola and tape (1999–2000); Pizzicato Verlag Helvetia; Swedish Music Information Centre
     Ma-Xia (馬夏) for viola solo (1997); STIM; Swedish Music Information Centre
 Per Nørgård (b. 1932)
     Billet Doux à Madame C. for alto flute, viola and harp (2005); Edition Wilhelm Hansen
     Hedda Gabler Suite for viola, harp and piano (1993); Edition Wilhelm Hansen
     Libro Per Nobuko for viola solo (1992); Edition Wilhelm Hansen
     Remembering Child for viola and chamber orchestra (1986); Edition Wilhelm Hansen
     The Rosy-Fingered Dawn for viola, flute and guitar (1998); Edition Wilhelm Hansen
 Andrew Norman (b. 1979)
     Sabina for viola solo (2008); Andrew Norman Music; Edition Schott; Project Schott New York
 Ludvig Norman (1831–1885)
     Sonata in G minor for viola and piano, Op. 32 (published 1875)
 Christopher Norton (b. 1953)
     Microjazz, 13 Pieces for viola and piano (1985–1989); Boosey & Hawkes
 Jan Novák (1921–1984)
     Sonata da chiesa I for viola and organ (1981); Český Hudební Fond
 Emmanuel Nunes (1941–2012)
     Einspielung III for viola solo (1981); Éditions Jobert
     Impromptu pour un voyage II for flute, viola and harp (1974–1975); Éditions Jobert
     Improvisation II: Portrait for viola solo (2002); G. Ricordi, München
     La Main noire for 3 violas (2006–2007); after the opera Das Märchen; G. Ricordi, München
     Versus III for alto flute and viola (1987–1990); G. Ricordi, München
 Michael Nyman (b. 1944)
     Drowning by Numbers for violin, viola and chamber orchestra (1998); Chester Music
     I'll Stake My Cremona to a Jew's Trump for electric violin and viola (1983); Chester Music
     Trysting Fields (from Drowning by Numbers) for violin, viola, string orchestra and harp (1992); Chester Music
     Viola and Piano for viola and piano (1995); Chester Music
 Gösta Nystroem (1890–1966)
     Concerto "Hommage à la France" for viola and orchestra (1940); Edition Suecia

References

External links
 Free scores featuring the viola at the International Music Score Library Project

 
Viola L-N